Jenny Bicks is an American television producer and screenwriter, most notable for her work as a television writer on the HBO series, Sex and the City and the creator and writer of the ABC series, Men in Trees. Her production company is Perkins Street Productions. She signed a deal with Fox in 2012.

Bicks was also a writer on the short-lived series, Leap of Faith and wrote the screenplay for the 2003 film, What a Girl Wants. She made her directorial debut with the short film, Gnome.  Her only known acting job was as Miss Haskell in the Drew Barrymore movie Never Been Kissed.

Bicks grew up in Manhattan, where she attended the Brearley School.

Filmography

References

External links

Screenwriters from New York (state)
Television producers from New York City
American women television producers
American television writers
Living people
Year of birth missing (living people)
American women television writers
Brearley School alumni
Film directors from New York City
21st-century American women